KEMJ (101.5 FM, "101-5 The Emoji") is a radio station broadcasting a Hot Adult Contemporary format serving the St. James/Fairmont, Minnesota area. The station is currently owned by Linder Radio Group.

On April 1, 2020, the then-KRRW changed its callsign to KEMJ, while the KRRW calls and the classic country format moved to 105.9 FM, which began a simulcast with KEMJ. On April 18, 2020, KEMJ/KRRW re-branded as "Northstar Country 101.5/105.9."  

On May 15, 2020, KEMJ stopped simulcasting KRRW and began stunting with a loop of "Tie Me Kangaroo Down, Sport" by Rolf Harris in preparation of a new format. This is the same stunt done in the past with other Linder Radio Group stations when a format switch was made. On May 18, KEMJ launched a Hot AC format branded as "101.5 The Emoji." KEMJ will mainly compete with Alpha Media's AC-formatted KEEZ, along with KSTP-FM and KTCZ in the neighboring Twin Cities market.

References

External links
KEMJ official website

Radio stations in Minnesota
Radio stations established in 1984
1984 establishments in Minnesota
Hot adult contemporary radio stations in the United States